Logona Esau (born 2 March 1987 on Nukufetau) is a Tuvaluan weightlifter.

Biography
He was the first athlete from Tuvalu to win a medal at an international competition, when he took bronze in the 62 kg combined event at the 2005 South Pacific Mini Games in Koror, Palau. As of 2006, he was ranked 132nd in the world by the International Weightlifting Federation.

In 2007, he won silver in the men's 69 kg clean and jerk at the Pacific Games in Apia, lifting 141 kg. In August 2008, he took part in the World Weightlifting Championships.

Esau represented Tuvalu at the 2006 Commonwealth Games in Melbourne and also represented Tuvalu at the 2008 Summer Olympics. The 2008 Summer Olympics in Beijing was the first Olympic Games, in which Tuvalu participated. Esau finished 23rd in his event. Esau was Tuvalu's flagbearer during the Games' opening ceremony.

References

External links
 

1987 births
Living people
Tuvaluan male weightlifters
Weightlifters at the 2008 Summer Olympics
Olympic weightlifters of Tuvalu
Commonwealth Games competitors for Tuvalu
Weightlifters at the 2014 Commonwealth Games